Regina (minor planet designation: 285 Regina) is a typical, although fairly large, Main belt asteroid. It was discovered by Auguste Charlois on 3 August 1889 in Nice, France. The asteroid is a suspected interloper in the Eucharis asteroid family.

References

External links
 
 

Background asteroids
Regina
18890803
Regina